Calvin Mackie (born ) is an American motivational speaker and entrepreneur. He is the older brother of actor Anthony Mackie.

Education 
Mackie was born in New Orleans, Louisiana and graduated in 1985 from McDonogh 35 High School, the first high school for African Americans in New Orleans. In 1990, Mackie earned a B.S. in mathematics from Morehouse College and a Bachelor of Mechanical Engineering from Georgia Tech through a dual-degree program. He also completed a M.S. in 1992 and a Ph.D. in 1996, both in mechanical engineering.

Career

Academia
Following graduation Mackie joined the faculty at Tulane University where he continued to pursue research related to heat transfer, fluid dynamics, energy efficiency and renewable energy until the Engineering Program was discontinued in 2006. In 2002, Mackie was promoted to Associate Professor with tenure. He has published numerous peer-reviewed articles and successfully competed for federal, state and private funding.

In 2004–2005, Mackie was a visiting professor in the Department of Chemical Engineering at the University of Michigan. He is a member of Phi Beta Kappa, Pi Tau Sigma and Tau Beta Pi National Honor Societies, and a Lifetime Member of the National Society of Black Engineers.

Mackie has also worked as a professional speaker. In 1992, he co-founded Channel ZerO, an educational and motivational consulting company; he has presented to civic and educational institutions, and Fortune 500 corporations.

Louisiana Recovery Authority
Louisiana Governor Kathleen Blanco appointed Mackie to the Louisiana Recovery Authority (LRA), the guiding agency to lead the state's rebuilding efforts following the catastrophic 2005 Hurricanes Katrina and Rita. As an ambassador of the LRA and a guest of the U.S. Embassy, he traveled to the country of Kuwait and appeared on Good Morning Kuwait and in international Arab newspapers. As a resident of pre- and post-Katrina New Orleans, Mackie has also been featured on HBO as a commentator on Spike Lee's documentary on the Katrina disaster When The Levees Broke: A Requiem in Four Parts. He has also appeared on national and local news shows talking about Katrina, including the PBS News Hour with Jim Lehrer, and the Tom Joyner Morning Show.

Patents and publications 
In November 1999, Mackie and Benjamin Hall Thomas received a patent (#US5988565A) on a device to retrofit luggage stowbins on 737 and 757 Boeing commercial airliners.

Partial bibliography

Awards
 2003 Presidential Award for Excellence in Science, Mathematics and Engineering Mentoring
 2003 National Title - "One Distinguished Graduate for Louisiana"
 2002 Black Engineer of the Year Award for College Level Educator
 2002 New Orleans Data News Weekly Trailblazer Award
 Pi Tau Sigma/ASME Excellence in Teaching Award in Mechanical Engineering for 2000 and 2002

References

1960s births
Year of birth missing (living people)
American mechanical engineers
American motivational speakers
Georgia Tech alumni
Living people
Morehouse College alumni
People from New Orleans
Tulane University faculty
Engineers from Louisiana
People from the Bronx